Alchemy: An Index of Possibilities is a solo album
by David Sylvian first released in December 1985 on cassette only, as a limited edition. Alchemy is an intermediary album,  released between his first solo album Brilliant Trees and his second solo album Gone to Earth, made up of two entirely separate projects recorded 1984 and 1985.

It was re-issued in its original form on CD in Japan in 1991. Additionally, subsequent versions was released. First 1989 in the boxset Weatherbox, and a remastered version 2003, which added tracks from more different projects, thus somewhat adding to the release not being a singular distinct album.

History
The opening suite "Words with the Shaman" was simultaneously issued as a 12" EP, while "Steel Cathedrals" was used in a short film by Sylvian and Yasayuki Yamaguchi, shot in Tokyo, Japan, and released on VHS. The soundtrack features the voice of Jean Cocteau.

The track “Preparations for a Journey” is from a Japanese autobiographical film of the same name, aired on Japanese television in February 1985. The film tracked Sylvian's career to that time.

In 2003, the album was remastered and included two additional songs: "The Stigma of Childhood (Kin)", originally recorded for Gaby Agis's dance piece, Kin; premiered 8 September 1987 at Almeida Theatre in London. Also "A Brief Conversation Ending in Divorce". Both songs were originally released in 1989 on the Pop Song EP.

In February 2019, as part of a redesigned monochrome sleeved vinyl reissue batch of his 80s albums, Alchemy - An Index of Possibilities was released with an earlier b/w photograph of Sylvian instead of the original artwork. No new mastering was done for this; the 2003 remaster was used. This was its first official release of the complete album on vinyl, save for a quickly withdrawn Australian pressing in the 80s.

Background
Sylvian was approached by a TV company 1984 to make a documentary about himself. "The idea didn’t appeal to me particularly but I was extremely short of money", he said 1984. So he did it, but “stretched the idea” to include sections of music and imagery. 
It was all made in a rush, but Sylvian liked one part, which became “Steel Cathedrals”: images of industrial buildings around Tokyo, shimmering and heaving with life, accompanied by a Sylvian/Sakamoto improvisation and all done in 48 hours.

So he brought that back to London with him and began reworking the music.
He wanted to release it as a video, but felt he should record some more music to give Virgin the possibility of releasing an LP. That led to “Words With The Shaman” – originally one long work but cut into three because it had "begun to over-reach itself … it sounded too much of a grand statement."

“Words With the Shaman”, meanwhile, surfaced as an EP, and a cassette, ”Alchemy – An Index of Possibilities”, was released containing the music from both that and the video.

Track listing
Original cassette and Japanese CD pressings

Weatherbox and 2003 CD pressings

Personnel
"Words with the Shaman": (Produced by David Sylvian and Nigel Walker) Recorded in London 1985.
David Sylvian – keyboards, guitars, tapes
Steve Jansen – drums, percussion, additional keyboards
Jon Hassell – trumpet
Holger Czukay – radio, dictaphone
Percy Jones – fretless bass

"Preparations For A Journey" (Produced by David Sylvian) Recorded in Tokyo 1984.
Performed by David Sylvian

"Steel Cathedrals": (Produced by David Sylvian) Recorded in Tokyo 1984 and London 1985.
David Sylvian – keyboards, tapes, digital percussion
Ryuichi Sakamoto – piano, strings
Steve Jansen – percussion
Kenny Wheeler – flugelhorn
Robert Fripp – guitar
Holger Czukay – dictaphone
Masami Tsuchiya – "guitar abstractions"

"A Brief Conversation Ending in Divorce": (Produced by David Sylvian and Steve Nye) Recorded 1989.
David Sylvian – guitars, synthesisers, keyboard programming
John Taylor – piano
Stuart Bruce – computer programming

"The Stigma of Childhood (Kin)"(Produced by David Sylvian) Recorded 1987 at home. The track was originally recorded for the Gaby Agis performance "Kin", premiered 8 September 1987 at Almeida Theatre in London.
Performed by David Sylvian.

References

External links
Steel Cathedrals part one – Part one of the video for "Steel Cathedrals".
Steel Cathedrals part two – Part two of the video for "Steel Cathedrals".

1985 albums
David Sylvian albums
Virgin Records albums